Polana is a village in the Municipality of Murska Sobota in the Prekmurje region of Slovenia.

References

External links
Polana on Geopedia

Populated places in the City Municipality of Murska Sobota